Elie Rock Malonga (born 21 September 1975) is a Congolese footballer. He played in 15 matches for the Congo national football team from 1995 to 2000. He was also named in Congo's squad for the 2000 African Cup of Nations tournament.

References

1975 births
Living people
Republic of the Congo footballers
Republic of the Congo international footballers
2000 African Cup of Nations players
Association football midfielders
Sportspeople from Brazzaville
FC Bremerhaven players
BV Cloppenburg players
VfB Oldenburg players
SSV Jeddeloh players
Regionalliga players
Oberliga (football) players
Republic of the Congo expatriate footballers
Republic of the Congo expatriate sportspeople in Germany
Expatriate footballers in Germany